Ussher Lee, a graduate of Trinity College, Dublin  was Dean of Kilmacduagh from 1803 to 1804; then Dean of Waterford from 1804 until his death in 1850.

He married in 1805, Hannah, the daughter of the Rev. Sheppard in Waterford Cathedral.

References

Alumni of Trinity College Dublin
Irish Anglicans
Deans of Waterford
Deans of Kilmacduagh